Groveland Shaker Village was a settlement of Shakers in Groveland, New York under the bishopric of Groveland.

In 1826, a Shaker group was organized that would become the Groveland Shaker Village, Groveland. They moved from Sodus in Wayne County, New York to escape worldly influences. When the membership of the sect declined, the Shakers sold the land to the state after they were assured it would be used for good purpose. Several of the Shaker buildings are still used today. The armory and church are of Shaker origin.

At the end of the 19th century, the state opened a facility for people with epilepsy here. While it is sometimes claimed that the name Sonyea is an acronym for "State of New York Epileptic Asylum," other authorities hold that the word is actually from the Seneca language and means "a warm and sunny place." Later the building was taken over by the state prison system.  It is now owned by the Groveland Correctional Facility.

References

Shaker communities or museums
1826 establishments in New York (state)
Populated places established in 1826
Populated places in Livingston County, New York